Barnwell Junction railway station served the suburb of Barnwell, Cambridgeshire, England from 1884 to 1966 on the Cambridge to Mildenhall railway.

History 
The station opened on 2 June 1884 by the Great Eastern Railway. It was situated at the end of a road that ran north of the A1303. Except for parcels, the station had no goods facilities. During World War I and World War II, the station was used to unload ambulance trains. The final passenger train was on 16 June 1962 and the station closed two days later, on 18 June 1962 and closed to goods traffic on 31 October 1966.

Site today 
As at March 2019 the station buildings and platforms are in situ with track still laid in one platform. The station buildings are in use as private residence.

References

External links 

Disused railway stations in Cambridgeshire
Former Great Eastern Railway stations
Railway stations in Great Britain opened in 1884
Railway stations in Great Britain closed in 1962
1884 establishments in England
1966 disestablishments in England